Adrián Lapeña Ruiz (born 16 April 1996) is a Spanish professional footballer who plays for Deportivo de La Coruña as a defender.

Lapeña moved to Eupen in the summer of 2019.

References

External links

1996 births
Living people
Sportspeople from Logroño
Spanish footballers
Footballers from La Rioja (Spain)
Association football defenders
Segunda División players
Primera Federación players
Segunda División B players
Tercera División players
Real Sociedad C footballers
Real Sociedad B footballers
CD Castellón footballers
Deportivo de La Coruña players
Belgian Pro League players
K.A.S. Eupen players
Spanish expatriate footballers
Expatriate footballers in Belgium
Spanish expatriate sportspeople in Belgium